Supreme Council of the Syrian Revolution (SCSR) is a Syrian opposition group supporting the overthrow of the Bashar al-Assad government in Syria during the Syrian civil war. It grants local opposition groups representation in its national organisation.

One of three national opposition groups — the other two being the Local Coordination Committees (LCCs) and Syrian Revolution General Commission (SRGC) — the SCSR has been described as catering to young protesters and being different from the other two groups in its political position. It sets "outlines for a political solution while also recognising the importance of armed struggle". Unlike the SRGC it has sent representatives to Syrian National Council (SNC) exile group meetings, and unlike the LCCs it is not formally a member of the Syrian National Council.

The group was classed as amongst the "most active" by think tank Mediterranean Affairs in 2019.

See also
Civil uprising phase of the Syrian Civil War
Syrian National Council
Syrian Revolution Network
Syrian Revolution Coordinators Union
Syrian Revolution General Commission

External links
 Facebook website

References

2011 establishments in Syria
Organizations of the Syrian civil war
Political opposition organizations
Politics of Syria
Syrian opposition